The California Lighthouse is a lighthouse located at Hudishibana near Arashi Beach and the Sasariwichi dunes on the northwest tip of Aruba.

This lighthouse was named for the steamship California, which was wrecked nearby on September 23, 1891.

Description
The lighthouse has completed a recent restoration in May 2016 which coincided with the 100th anniversary of the completion of the lighthouse.

Immediately adjacent to the lighthouse is a restaurant called La Trattoria el Faro Blanco (English: The White Lighthouse Restaurant), and also nearby is the Tierra del Sol Resort, Spa & Country Club.

The terrain is moon-like with sharp rocks sticking out of the ground, making it difficult for people to walk on without sturdy footwear.

See also

 List of lighthouses in the Netherlands
 List of lighthouses in Aruba

References

Lighthouses completed in 1916
Lighthouses in Aruba
Monuments of Aruba
Buildings and structures in Noord